Martín Suárez de Toledo (1520-1584) was a Spanish nobleman and conquistador. He served as interim Governor of the Río de la Plata and Paraguay.

Biography 

Born in Seville, his parents were Hernando Arias de Saavedra and Beatriz Suarez de Figueroa, belonging to the Spanish nobility. 
Martín Suárez de Toledo came to Paraguay in the expedition of Alvar Nunez Cabeza de Vaca in 1542.

He was married to María de Sanabria, daughter of Juan de Sanabria and Mencía Calderón Ocampo.

Martín Suárez de Toledo was Governor of Paraguay and Río de la Plata between July 31, 1569 and November 29, 1574, and was preceded by Felipe de Cáceres. He also served as Lieutenant governor of Asuncion between 1569-1572 and 1574-1575.

Martín Suárez de Toledo and María de Sanabria, were the parents of the Governor Hernando Arias de Saavedra.

References

External links 
argentinahistorica.com.ar

1520 births
1584 deaths
16th-century explorers
Explorers of Argentina
People from Buenos Aires
People from Asunción
Spanish colonial governors and administrators